This page provides supplementary chemical data on boric acid.

Thermodynamic properties

Spectral data

Structure and properties data

Material Safety Data Sheet 

The handling of this chemical may incur notable safety precautions. It is highly recommend that you seek the Material Safety Datasheet (MSDS) for this chemical from a reliable source and follow its directions.
SIRI
Science Stuff

References 

Chemical data pages
Chemical data pages cleanup